Asymmetric periflexural exanthem of childhood (APEC) (also known as "unilateral laterothoracic exanthem") is a rare, self-limited and spontaneously resolving skin rash of the exanthem type with unknown cause that occurs in children. It occurs primarily in the late winter and early spring, most common in Europe, and affecting girls more often than boys.

It is probably viral, but no virus has yet been associated with the condition.

See also 
 Skin lesion
 List of cutaneous conditions

References

External links 

Virus-related cutaneous conditions